Ardashes "Ardy" Kassakhian is an American-Armenian politician who has been the mayor of Glendale, California since April 2022.

Biography 
Kassakhian was born in Boston, Massachusetts (U.S.). He has been a resident of Glendale since 1986. He graduated from the University of California in Los Angeles with a Bachelor of Arts in History and received his Master of Arts in Public Policy and Administration from Northwestern University.

On 5 April 2022, Kassakhian was selected as the Glendale City’s Mayor, one of the largest cities in Los Angeles County. This was Kassakhian’s first time serving in the role of Mayor.

Political positions

Armenia and Artsakh 

In response to the 2022 blockade of the Republic of Artsakh, Kassakhian wrote a letter to Joe Biden, stating “I am extremely disappointed by the administration’s failure to hold Azerbaijan accountable for these flagrant human rights violations, and the continued waiver of Section 907 of the FREEDOM Support Act,” wrote Kassakhian.  “In continuing to supply Azerbaijan with U.S. military assistance – amidst verifiable reports of war crimes and egregious human rights abuses – we reward Azerbaijan’s aggression, and risk emboldening and enabling this type of conduct.”

LGBTQ+ Rights 
At GALAS LGBTQ+ Armenian Society's June 2022 Queernissage marketplace in Studio City, Los Angeles, Kassakhian stated "If someone’s going to threaten this group of people, I’m going stand there with them and make sure I’m there and present and show myself as a mayor of a large Armenian community — saying that I am here to serve every Armenian."

Kassakhian attended a December 2022 candlelight vigil hosted by glendaleOUT to mourn and remember LGBTQ+ deaths. The vigil raised funds for the Transgender Law Center and Pink Armenia.

Personal life 
He is married to Courtney Relph and has one son.

References

External links 
 

21st-century American politicians
American people of Armenian descent
Ethnic Armenian politicians
California Democrats
California city council members
Living people
Mayors of Glendale, California
Northwestern University alumni
Politicians from Boston
University of California, Los Angeles alumni
Year of birth missing (living people)